Roberto Meloni (born 20 February 1981 in Rome) is an Italian judoka. Height 1.79m, weight 90 kg

Achievements

External links
 
 

1981 births
Living people
Italian male judoka
Judoka at the 2004 Summer Olympics
Judoka at the 2008 Summer Olympics
Judoka at the 2012 Summer Olympics
Olympic judoka of Italy
Mediterranean Games gold medalists for Italy
Mediterranean Games medalists in judo
Competitors at the 2001 Mediterranean Games
Judoka of Centro Sportivo Carabinieri
20th-century Italian people
21st-century Italian people